An election to the Neath Rural District Council in West Glamorgan, Wales was held on 7 May 1964. It was preceded by the 1961 election, and followed by the 1967 election.

Boundary changes
The overall number of seats was increased from 29 to 30 by the creation of an additional seat at Tonna while the Coedffranc ward which had returned five members foe many decades was divided into five single-member wards.

Overview of the results
As at previous elections, Lanbour retained the vast majority of seats, but suffered some losses to the Independents.

Candidates
The profile of candidates was similar to three years previously with a number of long-serving Labour councillors returned unopposed. However, William Jones, the father of the Council was challenged for the first time in 36 years.

Outcome
William Jones narrowly held on in Baglan Higher while Labour lost a seat at Coedffranc.

Ward results

Baglan Higher (one seat)

Blaengwrach (two seats)

Blaenrhonddan, Bryncoch Ward (one seat)

Blaenrhonddan, Cadoxton Ward (one seat)

Blaenrhonddan, Cilfrew Ward (one seat)

Clyne (one seats)

Coedffranc, South Ward (one seat)

Coedffranc, East Central (one seat)

Coedffranc North Ward (one seat)

Coedffranc West Ward (one seat)

Coedffranc West Central (one seat)

Dyffryn Clydach (two seats)

Dulais Higher, Crynant Ward (one seat)

Dulais Higher, Onllwyn Ward (one seat)

Dulais Higher, Seven Sisters Ward (two seats)

Dulais Lower (one seat)

Michaelstone Higher (one seat)

Neath Higher (three seats)

Neath Lower (one seat)

Resolven, Resolven Ward (two seats)

Resolven, Rhigos Ward (two seats)

Resolven, Tonna Ward (two seats)

References

1964 Welsh local elections